A black box is a device, object, or system whose inner workings are unknown; only the "stimuli inputs" and "output reactions" are known characteristics.

Black box may also refer to:

Science and technology
 Black box (phreaking), a device to defeat telephone toll charges
 Eucalyptus largiflorens, a tree species with the common name black box

Transportation
 Accident data recorder, an optional vehicle installable device to record information related to (near) traffic accidents
 Event data recorder, a device installed in some automobiles to record information related to vehicle crashes or accidents
 Flight recorder, an aircraft-borne device used in disaster investigation, consisting of a flight data recorder and cockpit voice recorder
 Flight operations quality assurance
 Quick access recorder
 Train event recorder, a device that records data about the operation of train controls and performance
 Voyage data recorder, a device designed to collect data from various sensors on board a ship

Computing
 Black box theory, a systems engineering theory for black boxes
 Black-box testing, a form of software testing that involves adjusting inputs to an application without reference to the source code of the application
 Blackbox, a window manager that works on X Window System platforms
 BlackBox Component Builder, software development environment for Component Pascal
 Sun Modular Datacenter, prototype name Project Blackbox

Medicine
Any of a number of devices developed and sold by Albert Abrams, based on the pseudo-science of radionics
Black box warning, a type of warning that may be applied to medicines in the United States

Film and television
 Black Box (1978 film), an American short film by Scott B and Beth B
 Black Box (2002 film), an Argentine drama film (Caja Negra)
 Black Box (2013 film), an American drama film
 Black Box (2020 film), an American science-fiction horror film
 Black Box (2021 film), a Franco-Belgian mystery thriller film
 Black Box (TV series), a 2014 ABC television series
 Black Box (The Outer Limits), an episode from the 1995 revival of that TV series
 Survival in the Sky, a TV series on the investigations of aviation accidents known as Black Box in the UK
 The Black Box (2005 film), a French mystery film
 The Black Box (serial), a 1915 film serial
Black Box (video magazine), a Hungarian documentary video magazine and filmmaking group

Games
 Black Box (game), board and computer game
 Blackbox (video game), an iOS puzzle game
 EA Black Box, the video game studio formerly known as Black Box Games
 The Black Box, a canceled video game; See The Orange Box

Literature
 Black Box (short story), a short story by Jennifer Egan
 Black Box (novel), by Israeli writer Amos Oz
 Black Box (comics) a fictional character in the Marvel Comics Marvel Universe
 Black Box, a novel by Mario Giordano
 Black Box, a memoir by Shiori Itō
 Blackbox (novel) by Nick Walker
 The Black Box (novel) by Michael Connelly
 La boîte noire ("The Black Box"), a Spirou et Fantasio comic album

Music
 Black Box (band), Italian electro-dance music group
 "Black Box" (song), debut single of Australian Idol winner Stan Walker
 A Black Box, an album by Peter Hammill
 Black Box – Wax Trax! Records: The First 13 Years, a Wax Tax Box set album
 Black Box (Brown Eyed Girls album), album by South Korean group Brown Eyed Girls
 Black Box (Naked City album), compilation album by Naked City
 Black Box: The Complete Original Black Sabbath 1970–1978, a Black Sabbath album
 The Black Box (album), a box set album by Danish rock band Gasolin'

Other uses
 Black box (fiction), a fiction trope
 Black box theater, simple unadorned performance space
 Nuclear football, the briefcase that accompanies the President of the United States and contains nuclear missile launch codes, nicknamed "Black Box"
 Censor bars
 Black box trading or algorithmic trading
 Black Box Corporation, a supplier of computer network hardware based in Pennsylvania, US
 Black box approach to the function of states in international relations in theories such as realism and neorealism
 BlackBox (radio station), a radio station in Bordeaux, France

See also
 Blackboxing, a social process in science studies
 Black box warning, U.S. warning on a prescription drug
 Black Box Affair, a 1966 Eurospy film
 Box (disambiguation)
 Black body